Pacific Palisades is an American soap opera that aired on Fox during prime time from April to July 1997. Produced by Aaron Spelling, the show was canceled after thirteen episodes despite a last-minute attempt to increase ratings by casting Joan Collins as Laura's mother.
 
The show was originally supposed to be a vehicle for Erika Eleniak. She was due to play the Laura Sinclair role which was eventually given to Kimberley Davies.

Summary
Set in the Los Angeles district of the same name, the series follows the lives of young professionals who have it all, but haven't paid for it yet, on the Southern California fast track to fame, fortune, scandal and ruin.

The cast of characters includes Joanna (Michelle Stafford) and Nick Hadley (Jarrod Emick), a young married couple who left their native Midwest for the Pacific Coast where Nick has landed a job as an architect; Joanna's troubled teenage sister Rachel Whittaker (Natalia Cigliuti) – later discovered to be her illegitimate daughter at the end of the series; Rachel's friends Ashley (Jennifer Banko) and Michael (J. Trevor Edmond) who excel in sneakiness; Robert (Greg Evigan) and Kate Russo (Finola Hughes), whose sterling life is beginning to tarnish; Jessica Mitchell (Jocelyn Seagrave), a rising professional whose choice of men leads to trouble; Matt Dunning (Lucky Vanous), a construction businessman with a dark side; Laura Sinclair (Kimberley Davies), a real estate agent who does whatever it takes to close a deal; Cory Robbins (Dylan Neal), a promising but manipulative plastic surgeon; and beautiful Beth Hooper (Brittney Powell), who rents an apartment from Laura and is being romanced by Cory.

Cast list
 Natalia Cigliuti as Rachel Whittaker 
 Kimberley Davies as Laura Sinclair
 J. Trevor Edmond as Michael Kerris
 Jarrod Emick as Nick Hadley
 Michelle Stafford as Joanna Hadley
 Greg Evigan as Robert Russo
 Finola Hughes as Kate Russo 
 Brittney Powell as Beth Hooper
 Jocelyn Seagrave as Jessica Mitchell
 Lucky Vanous as Matt Dunning
 Dylan Neal as Cory Robbins
 Joan Collins as Christina Hobson
 Gianni Russo as Frank Nichols
 Paul Satterfield as John Graham
 Daphne Ashbrook as Julie Graham

Episodes

References

External links
 
 

1997 American television series debuts
1997 American television series endings
1990s American drama television series
American television soap operas
American primetime television soap operas
English-language television shows
Television series by CBS Studios
Television series by Spelling Television
Television shows set in Los Angeles